Besoco is an unincorporated community in Raleigh County, West Virginia, United States.

The name Besoco is an amalgamation of the Beckley Smokeless Coal Company.

References

Unincorporated communities in Raleigh County, West Virginia
Unincorporated communities in West Virginia
Coal towns in West Virginia